Brennan Camp (born 12 October 2000) is a professional footballer who plays for National League club Eastleigh, as a defender. Born in England, he has represented Scotland at youth international level.

Club career
Born in Dorchester, Camp was schooled at Royal Manor of Portland and scouted by AFC Bournemouth playing for Weymouth.

He joined Bournemouth in 2007. During the 2018–19 season, he spent time on loan at Poole Town, Dorchester Town and Weymouth. He progressed through the ranks at Bournemouth before signing his first professional contract in 2019. Camp made his debut for the club in a 6–0 defeat to Premier League side Norwich City, in the Fourth Round of the EFL Cup. He made his second appearance for the club in the FA Cup Third Round in a 1–3 away win at Yeovil Town. In February 2022, Camp joined National League side Eastleigh on a short-term loan deal. The loan was then extended until the end of the season. Camp was released by Bournemouth at the end of the 2021–22 season. Following his release, Camp joined Eastleigh on a permanent basis in June 2022.

International career
Camp has represented Scotland at the U19 level. He made his debut for Scotland U19s in a 1–3 away win against Turkey U19s.

Personal life
Camp is the grandson of former Bristol City player Gerry Gow.

References

External links
 
 
Profile at Scottish FA
Profile at Aylesbury United

2000 births
Living people
Scottish footballers
Footballers from Dorset
English people of Scottish descent
Association football defenders
AFC Bournemouth players
Portland United F.C. players
Poole Town F.C. players
Dorchester Town F.C. players
Weymouth F.C. players
Eastleigh F.C. players
Southern Football League players
National League (English football) players
Scotland youth international footballers